The Beopseongge or Hwaeom ilseung beopgye do (Diagram of the Avataṃsaka Single Vehicle Dharmadhātu) is a Buddhist text created by Uisang, Korean monk of the Silla period. The title is rendered in English as "The Song of Dharma Nature". This monumental script is widely known  to many Korean Seon Buddhism and Japanese zen and Chinese chan. Beopseongge is recorded on not only Tripitaka Koreana in Korea but Taishō Tripiṭaka in Japan.

Chart Stamp

The chart is written in 210 letters only. And letters are placed in 54 squared maze shaped chart that has no end. Since this maze shaped chart was made with the symbols and meanings of dharma and dharani, some monks used as mystic stamp like talisman for lay people.

This type of gatha was widely used in tang dynasty China and Silla dynasty Korea. It was the time when woodenblock printing carved with maze shape and poem on it, called 'Bansi(盤詩)', was flourished.
 
Recently used as logo of Haeinsa, one of the tri-gem(the buddha, the dharma and the sangha) temples in South Korea. The name or the temple 'Haein' also came from the gatha's 'Hae-in samadhi'.

Gatha

The gatha describes the dharma nature, written in 30 rows of 7 words in Chinese.

Uisang was deeply influenced by the Hwaeom Sutra(Avatamsaka Sutra, the Huayen Sutra). He wrote this gatha while he was attending the lecture of Hwaeom Sutra in tang dynasty china. As Original title of this chart, this gatha written precisely and concisely written for the essence of the Hwaeom Sutra.

Full text

 The Nature of the Dharma embraces everything; 	there is nothing besides this,

Hence the manifestations of the Mind are unmoving	and so, fundamentally quiet.

There is neither name nor form, everything is cut;

Without experiencing enlightenment  you cannot know.

Original Nature is unfathomable 	and sublime;

It never remains the same, but 	manifests according to affinities.

In the One there is the Many; 	Many is included in the One,

One is the Many; 	Many is the One.

A speck of dust 	Swallows the universe;

Each and every speck of dust 	Is also like this.

Countless kalpas	are one thought;

One thought	is countless kalpas.

The Nine Periods, 	the Ten Periods are like one

But remaining distinct. 	This is mysterious and sublime. 

The first thought 	is enlightenment,

Samsara and Nirvana 	are not two,

The material world, the spiritual world 	is Just-like-this, without discrimination.

The ten Buddhas and Samantabhadra Bodhisattva 	always dwell in this great state of the Mahayana. 

From the Hae-in Samadhi(Sāgaramudrā-samādhi) of Buddha

Unimaginable abilities come forth at will,

The Dharma, akin to precious treasures, 	rains upon sentient beings

Then depending on the vessel 	the individual receives the Dharma accordingly.

So if anyone wants 	to relish the original state

Without letting go of delusions, 	they will never succeed.

Free from past karmic ties 	saints use wise expedients,

They make each and everyone content 	in their Original Home.

Bodhisattvas use this Dhāraṇī 	like a bottomless treasure chest

To decorate and glorify 	Dharmadhātu, the palace of the Mind.

Sit down in your 	Original Place and see

That everything is 	as it is, like Buddha of old.

References

Korean Buddhist texts